Jean-Pierre Bloem (born 29 June 2000) is a South African cricketer. He made his first-class debut on 22 February 2021, for Easterns in the 2020–21 CSA 3-Day Provincial Cup. He made his List A debut on 28 February 2021, for Easterns in the 2020–21 CSA Provincial One-Day Challenge.

References

External links
 

2000 births
Living people
South African cricketers
Easterns cricketers
Place of birth missing (living people)